Area B was one of the eight district electoral areas (DEA) which existed in Belfast, Northern Ireland from 1973 to 1985. Located in the east of the city, the district elected seven members to Belfast City Council and contained the wards of Ballyhackamore; Belmont; Bloomfield; Island; Knock; Shandon; and Stormont. The DEA formed part of the Belfast East constituency.

History
The area was created for the 1973 local government elections, combining the whole of the former Victoria ward with just under half of the former Pottinger ward. It was abolished for the 1985 local government elections, for which an eighth ward had been created in the area. The Bloomfield ward became part of a new Pottinger DEA, while the remaining seven wards formed the Victoria DEA.

Election results

1973

1977

1981

References

Former District Electoral Areas of Belfast
1973 establishments in Northern Ireland
1985 disestablishments in Northern Ireland